This is a list of Billboard magazine's Top Hot 100 songs of 1969. The Top 100, as revealed in the year-end edition of Billboard dated December 27, 1969, is based on Hot 100 charts from the issue dates of January 4 through December 13, 1969.

See also
1969 in music
List of Billboard Hot 100 number-one singles of 1969
List of Billboard Hot 100 top-ten singles in 1969

References

1969 record charts
Billboard charts